The Northwest Florida Water Management District (NWFWMD) stretches from the St. Marks River Basin in Jefferson County to the Perdido River in Escambia County. The District is one of five water management districts in Florida created by the Water Resources Act of 1972. The District has worked for decades to protect and manage water resources in a sustainable manner for the continued welfare of people and natural systems across its 16-county region. It serves Bay, Calhoun, Escambia, Franklin, Gadsden, Gulf, Holmes, Jackson, Leon, Liberty, Okaloosa, Santa Rosa, Wakulla, Walton, Washington and western Jefferson County.

Within the District's  area, there are several major hydrologic (or drainage) basins: Perdido River and Bay System, Pensacola Bay System (Escambia, Blackwater and Yellow Rivers), Choctawhatchee River and Bay System, St. Andrew Bay System, Apalachicola River and Bay System and St. Marks River Basin (Wakulla River).

A nine-member Governing Board, appointed by the Governor and confirmed by the Florida Senate, guides District activities. Board members serve four-year terms without compensation and may be reappointed. An Executive Director oversees a staff of approximately 100 that includes hydrologists, geologists, biologists, engineers, planners, foresters, land managers and various administrative personnel.

Lands
The district reports having acquired more than 85 percent of the floodplains along the Choctawhatchee River, Escambia River and Econfina Creek have been acquired by the district.
 
Land Management

Recreation
Recreational opportunities are available on NWFWMD land along the following waterways:  springs, and pristine bottomland hardwood and associated upland forests.
 Apalachicola River
 Chipola River
 Choctawhatchee River
 Econfina Creek
 Escambia River
 Holmes Creek (Florida)
 Perdido River
 Yellow River (Florida)

Acreages by basin
Conservation acreages by basin are:
Perdido River	5,454
Escambia River	34,919
Garcon Point	3,245
Blackwater River	380
Yellow River	17,725
Choctawhatchee River/Holmes Creek	60,595
Econfina Creek	41,135
West Bay
719
Upper Chipola River	7,377
Apalachicola River	35,506
Lake Jackson	516
Conservation Easements	11,000

See also
St. Johns River Water Management District
South Florida Water Management District
Southwest Florida Water Management District
Suwannee River Water Management District

References

External links
Official Website

Water management authorities in the United States
State agencies of Florida
1972 establishments in Florida
Government agencies established in 1972